Yashodhara Ray Chaudhuri (born 1965) is a poet residing in Kolkata, West Bengal, India. She produced collections of Bengali poetry. She was awarded the Krittibas Puraskar in 1998 by the Krittibas Patrika.

She is also the recipient of Anita Sunil Kumar Basu Smriti Puraskar by Bangla Academy Kolkata ( 2006)  and Sahitya Setu Puraskar 2007

She received the Barna parichay Sharad Samman in 2011 .

Career
Her first published work was Panyasamhita (Psalms on Commodities) (1996, Kabita Pakshik). This was followed by Pisachinikabya (The She–Demonic Verses) (1998, Kabita Pakshik). She won the "Krittibas Puraskar" literary award in 1998. It is a book of love poems centering on alienation, distorted relationships and loneliness.

Chaudhuri authored two works in 1999, Chirantan Galpomala (Timeless Tales) and Radio-Bitan (The Radio Garden).

Abar Prothom theke Poro (Read Anew from A) (2001 Ananda Publishers) featured themes of the creation of life—especially childbirth—as well as childhood and society. Meyeder Projatantra ( The Republic of Women) (2005, Saptarshi Prakashan) brought the poet the Anita-Sunil Basu Smriti Puroskar of Paschimbanga Bangla Akademi of 2006. Themes include relationships between women. She wrote in the voice of the womb, which compares itself to the womb of the grandmother and the mother. Another section, "Dharabahik Uponyas" ( Serialized Novelette), tells about the ongoing journey of communication between women, across time, space and generations.

She published one collection of stories, "Meyeder Kichhu Ekta Hoyechhe", (2007, Deep Prokashan) including ten stories written between 1989 and 2006.

A collection of poetry, Kurukshetra, On-Line (2008, Saptarshi Prakashan), was seen by reviewers as a departure from her usual style, as the book relates to the recent killings and political unrest in Bengal, especially the Nandigram carnage. 
Recent publications include 'Chhaya-Shoririni'(2009, Pratibhas), a collection of three novellas. It deals with characters bordering on virtual reality, whose professional and personal life is submerged in a plethora of complex identities created by social networking sites, reality TV and news shows.

Chaudhuri also is a translator from original French language. She has translated Leonardo Da Vinci by Serge Bremley in 2008.

Godyabodhi, a collection of Bengali Proses, was published in January 2020. It contains nine essays on poetry. The writer′s own feelings on poetry, various doctrines regarding the foundation of it are described in this book.

Publications
Complete list of publications by Chaudhuri

Poetry
 1996   Panya Samhita 
 1998 Pisachini Kabya 
 1999  Chirantan Galpo mala 
 1999 Radio Bitan
 2001 Abar Prothom Theke Poro
 2005 Meyeder Projatantro 
 2007 Kurukkhetro Online
 2010 Virtualer Nabin Kishor
 2012 Kabita Sangraha (anthology)
 2015 Matribhumi Bumper
 2016  Nijhum Grontho 
 2017 Bhabadehe Swargiya Sangit
 2017 Shreshtho Kobita (anthology of selected poetry)

Prose
 2007 Bunchi Land (children's book)
 2007  Meyeder kichu ekta hoyeche (short stories)
 2008 Chhaya sharirini (3 novellas)
 2013 Solitaire (short stories)
 2014 Bishal Bharatiya Laghu Galpo (short stories)
 2017  Electra (short stories)
 2018 Bhalobasar Golpo (short stories. Sopan Publishers Kolkata)
 2019 Ladies Compartment (short stories. Deys Publishers Kolkata)
 2020 Godyabodhi (collection of Bengali Proses. Tobuo Proyas Prokashoni)

Translation work
 2008 Leonardo da Vinci (translation from original French)
 2012 Rog O tar Pratikar (translation from original French)
 2011 Bosquet Bobin Burine er kobita (translation from French poetry)

Education
Chaudhuri studied philosophy at Presidency College, Kolkata, then affiliated with the University of Calcutta, from 1984 to 1989.

Profession
Chaudhuri is a 1991 batch member of the Indian Audit and Accounts Service and works for the Comptroller and Auditor General of India. As of 2019 she has served in Jharkhand, West Bengal, Assam and Odisha.

References

Presidency University, Kolkata alumni
University of Calcutta alumni
Living people
1965 births
Bengali Hindus
Bengali writers
Bengali poets
Bengali female poets
20th-century Bengali poets
21st-century Bengali poets
Bengali novelists
Indian translators
Indian women translators
Indian poets
Indian women poets
Indian short story writers
Indian women short story writers
Indian children's writers
Indian novelists
Indian women novelists
20th-century Indian writers
20th-century Indian women writers
20th-century Indian poets
20th-century Indian translators
20th-century Indian short story writers
20th-century Indian novelists
21st-century Indian writers
21st-century Indian women writers
21st-century Indian poets
21st-century Indian translators
21st-century Indian short story writers
21st-century Indian novelists
Writers from Kolkata
Women writers from West Bengal